The 1980 SANFL Grand Final was an Australian rules football competition. Port Adelaide beat Norwood by 81 to 63.

References 

SANFL Grand Finals
SANFL Grand Final, 1980